Aya Traoré (born July 27, 1983) is a Senegalese female basketball forward and in 2011 captain of Senegalese women's national basketball team.

She previously played with Polfa in the Torell Basket Liga in Poland.

Personal
Traore was born in Dakar, Senegal to Seydu Traoré and Bineta Camara on 27 July 1983. She has 2 brothers and 1 sister. At Purdue, she majored in hospitality and tourism management. Traore attended high school in Louisville, Kentucky and was a Kentucky all-state performer in women's basketball in 2001. After graduating high school, Traore attended Dixie State College of Utah for 2 years. In the two years at Dixie State, Traore scored 12.3 points per game in her first season and became a second-team junior college women's basketball All-American, averaging over 21 ppg (6th in her division of basketball nationally). Traore then transferred to Purdue University, where she played for 2 seasons. During her last year at Purude, Traore averaged nearly 13 points and nearly 5 rebounds per game. Traore led Purdue to a 28–8 record before losing to the University of North Carolina in the Sweet 16 of the NCAA tournament.
At the AfroBasket Women 2009 and 2015 she was nominated Most Valued Player. She is the third African player who win this title two times.
With the National team of Senegal she played 5 African championships (2007 (finalist), 2009 (winner), 2011(finalist), 2013 (third) and 2015(winner)).

Purdue statistics
Source

Professional career
2006–2007 Cavigal Nice
2007–2008 PZU Polfa Pabianice, Poland
2008 MKS Polkowice, Poland
2008–2009 Hit Kranjska Gora, Kranjska Gora, Slovenia
- Montgomery Dream
2010–2011 Club Bàsquet Olesa

References

External links
Biography of pre-senior year at Purduesports.com

1983 births
Living people
Utah Tech University alumni
Junior college women's basketball players in the United States
Purdue Boilermakers women's basketball players
Senegalese expatriate basketball people in Poland
Senegalese expatriate basketball people in Spain
Senegalese expatriate basketball people in the United States
Senegalese women's basketball players
Basketball players from Dakar
Forwards (basketball)
Basketball players at the 2016 Summer Olympics
Olympic basketball players of Senegal
Senegalese expatriate sportspeople in Slovenia
African Games gold medalists for Senegal
African Games medalists in basketball
Competitors at the 2011 All-Africa Games